The Bahraini passport is issued to Bahraini citizens for international travel. They are issued by the General Directorate of Nationality, Passports & Residence, one of the earliest bodies of its kind in the region, which first issued passports in 1929.

Types of Bahraini passport

Ordinary passport

Granted to a Bahraini citizen.

Diplomatic passport

A diplomatic passport is granted to:

 The King and his Crown Prince.
 The Prime Minister.
 The Commander-in-Chief of the Bahrain Defense Force and Head of the National Guard.
 Ministers
 Deputy Commander-in-Chief and Chief of Staff of the Bahrain Defense Force, Head of Public Security and Director of Staff of the National Guard.
 Members of the Bahraini diplomatic and consular corps and members of the missions of the Kingdom of Bahrain to international organizations that are counterparts to members of the diplomatic corps.
 Judges, members of the Public Prosecution Office, members of the Legislation and Legal Opinion Commission, and members of the military judiciary in the Bahrain Defense Force.

With the approval of the King, a diplomatic passport may be granted to:

 State employees sent on an official mission abroad, upon a request from the Minister of Foreign Affairs.
 Delegates to represent the Kingdom of Bahrain is one of the specialized agencies of the United Nations while performing their duties.
 Whom the King considers granting him this passport, other than the previous categories.

Special Passport

A special passport is granted to:

 Working employees of the rank of Undersecretary of the Ministry or above, and the like.
 Judges, members of the Public Prosecution Office, members of the Legislation and Legal Opinion Commission, and members of the Department of Legal Affairs and Military Courts in the Ministry of Interior.
 The former president and members of the Shura Council and the House of Representatives.
 Former ministers, former undersecretaries of ministries, and the like, after the approval of the Prime Minister.
 Former ambassadors and ministers plenipotentiary, provided that they have not been dismissed by a disciplinary decision.
 Administrative and clerical staff attached to diplomatic and consular missions and missions of the Kingdom of Bahrain to international organizations, after the approval of the Minister of Foreign Affairs.
 Heads of municipal councils and vice-presidents.
 Whosoever deems His Majesty the King to grant him a special passport other than the previous categories.
 Military personnel of the Bahrain Defense Force, the Public Security Forces, the National Guard and the National Security Apparatus of the rank of brigadier general and above are not eligible for diplomatic passports.
 Retired military personnel from the Bahrain Defense Force, the Public Security Forces, the National Guard and the former National Security Apparatus obtained a special passport of the rank of brigadier general or above, provided that the termination of service was not due to a disciplinary reason or a final judicial ruling, and after obtaining the approval of the higher command of the military authority to which he was affiliated.

Appearance 

Bahrain passport is red in colour. The front side shows Bahrain's coat of arms, with the name of the country above it and the inscription "passport" below it. The passport contains the holder's name, photograph, signature and date of birth and other factors that help identify him or her.

Identity page 
 Photo of passport holder (Width: 40mm, Height: 60mm; Head height (up to the top of the hair): 38mm; Distance from top of the photo to the top of the hair: 6mm; white background)
 Type ("P" for passport)
 Country code
 Passport serial number
 Passport holder's first and last name
 Nationality
 Date of birth (DD MM YYYY)
 Gender (M for male or F for female)
 Place of birth
 Date of Issue (DD MM YYYY)
 Passport Holder's signature
 Validity date (ID.M.YYYY)

Passport written in Arabic and English.

Visa requirements

In June 2019, Bahraini citizens had visa-free or visa on arrival access to 89 countries and territories, up from 78 in February 2018, ranking the Bahraini passport 50th in the world according to the Visa Restrictions Index.

See also
 Visa policy of Bahrain
 Visa requirements for Bahraini citizens

References

Bahra
Government of Bahrain